Hypena vestita, is a moth of the family Erebidae first described by Frederic Moore in 1885. It is found in India, Sri Lanka and Borneo.

Forewings uniform greyish brown. Submarginal dark marking distal to dentate. Postmedial border of the black area curves.

References

Moths of Asia
Moths described in 1885
vestita